Hamblen County is a county located in the U.S. state of Tennessee. As of the 2020 census, the population was 64,499. Its county seat and only incorporated city is Morristown. Hamblen County is the core county of the Morristown Metropolitan Statistical Area, which includes Hamblen, Jefferson, and Grainger counties. The county and the Morristown MSA is included in the Knoxville-Morristown-Sevierville, TN Combined Statistical Area.

History
Hamblen County was created in 1870 from parts of Jefferson, Grainger, and Hawkins counties.  The county is named in honor of Hezekiah Hamblen (1775–1854), an early settler, landowner, attorney, and member of the Hawkins County Court for many years.  Governor Dewitt Clinton Senter, a resident of the county, used his influence to assist in its establishment. The Hamblen County Courthouse was completed in 1874.

During World War I, Hamblen County was the only county in the United States to have two Medal of Honor recipients. Edward R. Talley and Calvin Ward both earned them while fighting on the Western Front.

During World War II, the attack transport naval ship USS Hamblen was named after the county.

Historic sites
 Bethesda Presbyterian Church
 Crockett Tavern Museum
Morristown College, now Fulton-Hill Park
Morristown Main Street Historic District
 Rose Center

Geography
It is the third-smallest county in Tennessee by land area and fourth-smallest by total area.

Adjacent counties
Hawkins County (northeast)
Greene County (east)
Cocke County (south)
Jefferson County (southwest)
Grainger County (northwest)

State protected areas
Panther Creek State Park
Rankin Wildlife Management Area (partial)

Major highways

Waterways 
The main source of water on Hamblen County is the man-made Cherokee Lake. Cherokee Lake was created during WWII as part of the TVA hydroelectric project. The lake is fed by multiple sources, including a series of natural creeks and runoff waters. The lake begins with its first source at Poor Valley Creek in Hawkins County, extends through neighboring Grainger County and then Hamblen County. Cherokee Lake then ends with Cherokee Dam where the water is drained into the Holston River. In total, Cherokee Lake has 28,780 acres of surface area and extends for 400 miles of shoreline; though, only a portion of this resides in Hamblen County.

Demographics

2020 census

As of the 2020 United States census, there were 64,499 people, 24,456 households, and 16,391 families residing in the county.

2010 census
As of the census of 2010, there were 62,544 people, 29,693 households, and 17,161 families residing in the county.  The population density was 388 people per square mile (138/km2).  There were 24,560 housing units at an average density of 153 per square mile (59/km2).  The racial makeup of the county was 91.74% White, 4.22% African American, 0.20% Native American, 0.70% Asian, 0.09% Pacific Islander, and 1.42% from two or more races. Those of Hispanic or Latino origins constituted 10.73% of the population.

There were 24,560 households, out of which 28.4% had children under the age of 18 living with them, 51.3% were married couples living together, 13.1% had a female householder with no husband present, and 30.1% were non-families. 25.70% of all households were made up of individuals living alone, and 11.2% had someone living alone who was 65 years of age or older.  The average household size was 2.51 and the average family size was 2.98.

In the county, the population was spread out, with 23.30% under the age of 20, 5.7% from 20 to 24, 25.7% from 25 to 44, 26.7% from 45 to 64, and 15.9% who were 65 years of age or older.  The median age was 39.6 years. For every 100 females, there were 94.9 males.  For every 100 females age 18 and over, there were 92.30 males.

The median income for a household in the county was $39,807, and the median income for a family was $48,353. Males had a median income of $36,166 versus $27,094 for females. The per capita income for the county was $21,162.  17.7% of the population and 13.2% of families were below the poverty line.  Out of the total people living in poverty, 15.7% are under the age of 65 and 19.3% are 65 or older.

Economy 

Hamblen County's economic development in recent decades has been phenomenal. Several large industrial parks on the eastern, western, and southern parts of the county are home to manufacturing facilities for regionally, nationally, and internationally based corporations.

Government 
The Hamblen County government consists of twenty-six elected officials, twelve appointed officials, and the staffing and offices therein. In addition to these offices, the county also houses a liaison office with the University of Tennessee for its Agricultural Extension office.

Elected Officials 

 County Mayor - Bill Brittain
 Sheriff - Esco Jarnigan
 Register of Deeds - Jim Clawson
 Circuit Court Clerk - Teresa West
 Trustee - Scotty Long
 Assessor of Property - Keith Ely
 Road Superintendent - Barry Poole
 County Clerk - Penny Petty
 General Sessions Judge Division 1 - Doug Collins
 General Sessions Judge Division 2 - Janice Snider
 Chancellor – 3rd Judicial District - Douglas Jenkins
 Criminal Court Judge - John Dugger
 County Commissioners (14 in total)

Appointed Officials 

 Finance Director
 Emergency Mgmt. Director
 Cherokee Park Director
 Director of Schools
 Administrator of Elections
 Clerk & Master
 Juvenile Services Director
 Veteran's Service Officer
 Planning Director
 Work Program Director
 Human Resource Manager
 Drug Court Director

Communities

City
Morristown (county seat, small portions in Jefferson)

Town
White Pine (mostly in Jefferson)

Census-designated place
Russellville

Unincorporated communities

Lowland
Talbott (partial)
Whitesburg
Witt

Public Education 
The Hamblen County Department of Education has two high schools, four middle schools, eleven elementary/intermediate schools, and one alternative-placement school. The Tennessee Board of Regents also has a community college located in Morristown, as well as a technical college for vocational training. Hamblen County's department of education's current mission statement, as of the 2019–2020 school year, is, "The mission of Hamblen County Department of Education is to educate students so they can be challenged to successfully compete in their chosen fields." The current superintendent of Hamblen County Schools is Arnold Bunch As of the 2019–2020 school year, Hamblen County Department of Education has 10,424 students enrolled.

Elementary schools 

 Alpha Elementary School
 Fairview-Marguerite Elementary School
 Hillcrest Elementary School
 John Hay Elementary
 Lincoln Heights Elementary School
 Manley Elementary
 Russellville Elementary School
 Union Heights Elementary
 West Elementary School
 Whitesburg Elementary School
 Witt Elementary School

Middle schools 

 East Ridge Middle School
 Lincoln Heights Middle School
 Meadowview Middle School
 West View Middle School

High schools 

 Morristown-Hamblen High School East
 Morristown-Hamblen High School West

Community College 

 Walters State Community College

Technical College 

 Tennessee College of Applied Technology, Morristown

Alternative school 

 Miller Boyd Alternative School

Private Education

Lakeway Christian Schools 
Lakeway Christian Schools is a private school system that contains three schools in Hamblen County. Cornerstone Christian Academy enrolls students from grades PreK through 5. Lakeway Christian Academy enrolls students from grades 6 through 12. Tri-Cities Cristian Academy enrolls students from grades 9 through 12. The current mission state is, "Partnering with families to provide a Christ-centered and academically challenging education, equipping students with a biblical worldview and a heart for Christ, that they may grow in wisdom, stature and in favor with God and man."

All Saints' Episcopal School 
All Saints' Episcopal School was founded in 1967 as a preschool. In 1985, the school was expanded to include first grade. Since then, the school has further expanded (completion in 1992) to enroll students from PreK  to 8th grade.

Faith Christian Academy 
Faith Christian Academy enrolls students from grades 1 through 12.

Morristown Covenant Academy 
Morristown Covenant Academy was founded in 1985 and enrolls students in grades Kindergarten through 12. In their high school educational program, students can choose an educational path for general education, college/university readiness, or vocational readiness. The Morristown Covenant Academy also houses a day care and pre-k program.

Politics
Like almost all of East Tennessee, Hamblen County has long voted overwhelmingly Republican, starting with its powerful Unionist sentiment during the Civil War. The last Democratic candidate to carry the county was Jimmy Carter in 1976.

See also
National Register of Historic Places listings in Hamblen County, Tennessee

References

External links

 Official site
 Morristown Area Chamber of Commerce
 The Citizen Tribune, Morristown's newspaper
 Hamblen County Board of Education
 Hamblen County TNGenWeb site
 The Morristown-Hamblen Public Library website

 
1870 establishments in Tennessee
Populated places established in 1870
Morristown metropolitan area, Tennessee
Counties of Appalachia
East Tennessee